In category theory, monoidal functors are functors between monoidal categories which preserve the monoidal structure. More specifically, a monoidal functor between two monoidal categories consists of a functor between the categories, along with two coherence maps—a natural transformation and a morphism that preserve monoidal multiplication and unit, respectively.  Mathematicians require these coherence maps to satisfy additional properties depending on how strictly they want to preserve the monoidal structure; each of these properties gives rise to a slightly different definition of monoidal functors

 The coherence maps of lax monoidal functors satisfy no additional properties; they are not necessarily invertible.
 The coherence maps of strong monoidal functors are invertible.
 The coherence maps of strict monoidal functors are identity maps.

Although we distinguish between these different definitions here, authors may call any one of these simply monoidal functors.

Definition 
Let  and  be monoidal categories.

,
,

    and    
commute in the category .

Variants 

 The dual of a monoidal functor is a comonoidal functor; it is a monoidal functor whose coherence maps are reversed. Comonoidal functors may also be called opmonoidal, colax monoidal, or oplax monoidal functors.
 A strong monoidal functor is a monoidal functor whose coherence maps  are invertible.
 A strict monoidal functor is a monoidal functor whose coherence maps are identities.
 A braided monoidal functor is a monoidal functor between braided monoidal categories (with braidings denoted ) such that the following diagram commutes for every pair of objects A, B in  :

 A symmetric monoidal functor is a braided monoidal functor whose domain and codomain are symmetric monoidal categories.

Examples 
 The underlying functor  from the category of abelian groups to the category of sets.
 If  is a (commutative) ring, then the free functor  extends to a strongly monoidal functor  (and also  if  is commutative).
 If  is a homomorphism of commutative rings, then the restriction functor  is monoidal and the induction functor  is strongly monoidal.
 An important example of a symmetric monoidal functor is the mathematical model of topological quantum field theory, which has been recently developed. Let  be the category of cobordisms of n-1,n-dimensional manifolds with tensor product given by disjoint union, and unit the empty manifold. A topological quantum field theory in dimension n is a symmetric monoidal functor 
 The homology functor is monoidal as  via the map .

Alternate notions
 ψAB : F(A ⇒ B) → FA ⇒ FB
of φAB commonly used in functional programming. The relation between ψAB and φAB is illustrated in the following commutative diagrams:

Properties

Monoidal functors and adjunctions 
Suppose that a functor  is left adjoint to a monoidal .

and
.

Similarly, a right adjoint to a comonoidal functor is monoidal, and the right adjoint of a comonoidal adjunction is a strong monoidal functor.

See also 
 Monoidal natural transformation

References 

Monoidal categories